This is a list of mammals in Illinois. A total of 70 species are listed. Species currently extirpated in the state include the white-tailed jackrabbit, black bear, gray wolf, elk, American marten, cougar, fisher, porcupine, and bison.

The following tags are used to highlight each species' conservation status as assessed by the International Union for Conservation of Nature:

Opossums

Family Didelphidae (opossums)
Subfamily: Didelphinae
Genus: Didelphis
 Virginia opossum, D. virginiana

Armadillos
Family Dasypodidae (armadillos)
Genus: Dasypus
 Nine-banded armadillo, D. novemcinctus

Insectivores

Eulipotyphlans are insectivorous mammals. Shrews closely resemble mice, while moles are stout-bodied burrowers.
Family Soricidae (shrews)
Genus: Blarina
 Northern short-tailed shrew, B. brevicauda 
 Southern short-tailed shrew, B. carolinensis 
Genus: Cryptotis
 North American least shrew, C. parva 
Genus: Sorex
 Cinereus shrew, S. cinereus 
 Southeastern shrew, S. longirostris 
Family Talpidae (moles)
Genus: Scalopus
 Eastern mole, S. aquaticus

Rodents

Family Castoridae (beavers)
Genus: Castor
North American beaver, C. canadensis 
Family Cricetidae (New World mice, rats, voles, lemmings, muskrats)
Genus: Microtus
Prairie vole, M. ochrogaster 
Meadow vole, M. pennsylvanicus 
Woodland vole, M. pinetorum 
Genus: Oryzomys
Marsh rice rat, O. palustris 
Genus: Ochrotomys
Golden mouse, O. nuttalli 
Genus: Neotoma
Eastern woodrat, N. floridana 
Genus: Ondatra
Muskrat, O. zibethicus 
Genus: Peromyscus
Cotton mouse, P. gossypinus 
White-footed mouse, P. leucopus 
Eastern deer mouse, P. maniculatus 
Genus: Reithrodontomys
Western harvest mouse, R. megalotis 
Genus: Synaptomys
Southern bog lemming, S. cooperi 
Family Dipodidae (jumping mice)
Genus: Zapus
Meadow jumping mouse, Z. hudsonius 
Family Erethizontidae (New World porcupines)
Genus: Erethizon
North American porcupine, E. dorsatum  extirpated
Family Muridae (Old World mice and rats)
Genus: Mus
House mouse, M. musculus  introduced
Genus: Rattus
Brown rat, R. norvegicus  introduced
Family Sciuridae (squirrels)
Genus: Glaucomys
Southern flying squirrel, G. volans 
Genus: Marmota
Groundhog, M. monax 
Genus: Sciurus
Eastern gray squirrel, S. carolinensis 
Fox squirrel, S. niger 
Genus: Poliocitellus
Franklin's ground squirrel, P. franklinii 
Genus: Tamiasciurus
American red squirrel, T. hudsonicus 
Genus: Ictidomys
Thirteen-lined ground squirrel, I. tridecemlineatus 
Genus: Tamias
Eastern chipmunk, T. striatus 
Family Geomyidae (pocket gophers)
Genus: Geomys
Plains pocket gopher, G. bursarius

Lagomorphs

Family Lagomorpha (rabbits, hares and pikas)
Genus: Lepus
White-tailed jackrabbit, L. townsendii  extirpated
Genus: Sylvilagus
Swamp rabbit, S. aquaticus 
Eastern cottontail, S. floridanus

Bats

Family Vespertilionidae (vesper bats)
Genus: Corynorhinus
Rafinesque's big-eared bat, C. rafinesquii 
Townsend's big-eared bat, C. townsendii 
Genus: Eptesicus
Big brown bat, E. fuscus 
Genus: Lasionycteris
Silver-haired bat, L. noctivagans 
Genus: Lasiurus
Eastern red bat, L. borealis 
Hoary bat, L. cinereus 
Genus: Myotis
Southeastern myotis, M. austroriparius 
Gray bat, M. grisescens 
Eastern small-footed myotis, M. leibii 
Little brown bat, M. lucifugus 
Northern long-eared bat, M. septentrionalis 
Indiana bat, M. sodalis 
Genus: Nycticeius
Evening bat, N. humeralis 
Genus: Perimyotis
Tricolored bat, P. subflavus

Carnivores

Family Canidae (canids)
Genus: Canis
Coyote, C. latrans 
Gray wolf, C. lupus  extirpated
Genus: Urocyon
Gray fox, U. cinereoargenteus 
Genus: Vulpes
Red fox, V. vulpes 
Family Procyonidae (raccoons)
Genus: Procyon
Common raccoon, P. lotor 
Family Ursidae (bears)
Genus: Ursus
American black bear, U. americanus  extirpated
Family Felidae (cats)
Genus: Lynx
Bobcat, L. rufus 
Genus: Puma
Cougar, P. concolor  extirpated
Family Mustelidae (weasels, minks, martens, fishers, and otters)
Genus: Lontra
North American river otter, L. canadensis  
Genus: Martes
American marten, M. americana  extirpated
Genus: Mustela
Least weasel, M. nivalis 
Genus: Neogale
Long-tailed weasel, N. frenata 
American mink, N. vison  
Genus: Pekania
Fisher, P. pennanti  extirpated
Genus: Taxidea
American badger, T. taxus  
Family Mephitidae (skunks)
Genus: Mephitis
Striped skunk, M. mephitis

Even-toed ungulates
Family Cervidae (deer)
Genus: Cervus
Elk, C. canadensis  extirpated
Genus: Odocoileus
White-tailed deer, O. virginianus  
Family Bovidae (bovids)
Genus: Bison
American bison, B. bison  extirpated

See also
 Lists of mammals by region
 List of U.S. state mammals
 List of birds of Illinois

References

Mammals
Illinois